Aalesunds Kreditbank A/S was a commercial bank based in Ålesund, Norway. It was founded in 1877 as the first commercial bank in Ålesund and remained in operation until 1951. It merged with Møre Kreditbank, Ørsta Aksjebank and Søndmøre Fiskeri og Handelsbank to create Sunnmøre Kreditbank.

References

Bibliography
 

Defunct banks of Norway
Companies based in Ålesund
Banks established in 1877
1951 disestablishments in Norway
Norwegian companies established in 1877

External links